A drafting dog, pulling dog, or draft dog (also spelt draught dog) is a dog bred and traditionally used for pulling a dogcart, or in winter also for sled pulling. Dogs bred for this work have strong builds. Many draft dogs are either mastiffs or of livestock guardian descent, both of which are dogs that are solidly-built.

Working animals 

These dogs are working animals, traditionally used for pulling small carts called dogcarts. The size of the cart matched the size of the dog. In modern times, dog carting has become a leisure and competition activity. In the 20th century, headcollars were introduced to make control simpler, and they have become standard equipment in a variety of designs.

Several popular breeds were once bred specifically to pull carts, including Collies, Bernese Mountain Dogs, St. Bernards, Bouvier des Flandres, Newfoundlands and Rottweilers, though they often found other uses such as guard dogs and sheepdogs.

The Greater Swiss Mountain Dog was a large working dog used by butchers, cattle dealers, manual workers and farmers, who used them as guard dogs, droving and draught dogs.

The Bernese Mountain Dog is a large working dog with a calm temperament ideal for pulling a cart, as they used to do in Switzerland. More recently they have been used to pull carts to give children rides, or to appear in parades.

In culture

The Dutch-Belgian artist Henriëtte Ronner-Knip (1821–1909) painted many pictures in the Romantic style of drafting dogs pulling dogcarts. Sled dogs were used to pull equipment and men efficiently over the snow and ice on Roald Amundsen's 1911 expedition to the South Pole.

See also

References

External links 

 St. Bernard video
 Rottweiler video

Dog roles
Working dogs